Indian Institute Of Aeronautics (IIA) is one of the oldest Aircraft Maintenance Training Institute located at New Delhi in India, founded by Captain Ram Niwas Sinha, an avid Aviator. It was established in year 1982 at Patna and got the approval in 1983  by the Director General of Civil Aviation, Govt. of India. IIA was transferred to Mundka, New Delhi from its initial approved base of Patna Airport in year 2001.  IIA is active in the field of Aircraft Maintenance Training through generation of trained technical manpower for the Airlines / Aviation Industry.

The organisation forfeited its DGCA approval in year 2013 and went for European Union Aviation Safety Agency EASA Basic Aircraft Maintenance Training Approval in year 2015. It got privileges to run EASA Part-66 aircraft maintenance training program in Category B1.1 Aeroplane Turbine.

Curriculum activities and AME Training Programme framed keeping in view the current technology in force in the Aircraft Maintenance Engineering, are approved by European Union Aviation Safety Agency. Infrastructure and Training facilities of Indian Institute of Aeronautics are complied with EASA requirement. 

With its proactive legacy in aviation for more than four decades, IIA together with JRN Institute of Aviation Technology at New Delhi and Bharat Institute of Aeronautics at Patna combined forms IIA Group of Institutions, which are operative under the same management under certification of DGCA and EASA approved aircraft maintenance training courses. The training standards followed and practiced by IIA Group are equivalent to International Civil Aviation Organization (ICAO type-II). IIA Group also hold training with examination privileges for EASA Part-66 aircraft maintenance license.

Scope Of Approval
 Aeroplane and Power Plant - Category B1.1.
 Avionics Electrical System, Instrument System and Radio Navigation - Category B2

The aviation industry has evolved over a period of time in India and IIA has pioneered in supply highly skilled Aircraft Maintenance Engineers to this evolving industry. More than 50% of Technical manpower working in the industry belongs to this institution.

The partnership with AIRBUS is inclined for the knowledge development and add-on skills for the potential aircraft maintenance trainees who have completed their basic training standards.

Admissions

Eligibility for Admission
 10+2 with science stream (PCM) or Graduation with PCM or Diploma in Mechanical, Electrical or Electronics Engineering.
 Minimum age should be 16 years at the time of admission.
 Medical fitness certificate issued by registered medical practitioner.

Admission Test
Students will be selected through an admission test (AME Entrance Exam) of seventy-five marks. This entrance exam is conducted every year in the month of April.

Choice of Centre and Stream
Choice of training centre from two Institutes and stream from Mechanical and Avionics stream, depends on student's choice, subject to availability. As per merit, the students are called for counselling and admission and seats and stream are allotted.

Hostel Facility
Separate hostels are available for boys & girls at every location.

References

External links 

 www.iiagroup.co.in
 Dgca Approved AME Colleges
 Top AME college in India
 EASA Approved organisations in India
 ACT for Academy, Airbus Aircraft

Aeronautics organizations
Aviation in India
Education in Delhi
Vocational education in India
Aviation organisations based in India